Big Flat Brook is the name of Flat Brook upstream of the inflow of Little Flat Brook, a tributary of the Delaware River, in Sussex County, New Jersey in the United States.

See also
List of rivers of New Jersey

References

External links
High Point State Park
Stokes State Forest

Rivers of New Jersey
Tributaries of the Delaware River
Rivers of Sussex County, New Jersey